Joseph Jacobsen (born February 9, 1987 in Anaheim, California) is an American pair skater.

Early in his career, he competed with Janey Mayne. He teamed up with Bianca Butler in 2000. Butler & Jacobsen were the 2007 US National junior silver medalists. They qualified for the 2005 Junior Grand Prix Final in their first year on the circuit, and placed sixth.

Although they placed seventh on the day, they were later moved up a spot to a sixth-place finish at the 2007-2008 Junior Grand Prix Final following the retroactive disqualification of first-place-finishers Vera Bazarova and Yuri Larionov due to a positive doping sample from Larionov.

Their partnership ended in February 2009. Jacobsen teamed up with Amanda Dobbs. They won the pewter medal at the 2010 Pacific Coast Sectional Championships to qualify for the 2010 U.S. Figure Skating Championships.

Joseph Jacobsen was a principal skater with Disney On Ice. He portrayed the role of Flynn Rider from the movie Tangled. He now coaches at St. Margaret's Bay Skating Club with his wife Stephanie Steele. He coaches his favorite person on earth, Lexie.

Programs 
(with Butler)

Competitive highlights
(with Dobbs)

(with Butler)

References

External links

 

American male pair skaters
1987 births
Living people
Sportspeople from Anaheim, California
20th-century American people
21st-century American people